Bruce Bennett (born Harold Herman Brix, also credited Herman Brix; May 19, 1906February 24, 2007) was an American film and television actor who prior to his screen career was a highly successful college athlete in football and in both intercollegiate and international track-and-field competitions. In 1928 he won the silver medal for the shot put at the Olympic Games held in Amsterdam. Bennett's acting career spanned more than 40 years. He worked predominantly in films until the mid-1950s, when he began to work increasingly in American television series.

Early life and Olympics

Harold Herman Brix was born and raised in Tacoma, Washington, where he attended Stadium High School from which he graduated in 1924. He was the fourth of five children born to an immigrant couple from Germany. His eldest brother, Herman (his father's favorite son) died before Harold's birth and he was given the middle name Herman in memory of his brother. Before finishing high school he had discontinued using his own first name in favor of his middle name as this pleased his father, a lumberman who owned a number of logging camps. His first career was as an athlete. At the University of Washington, where he majored in economics, he played football (tackle) in the 1926 Rose Bowl and was a track-and-field star. Two years later, he won the Silver medal for the shot put in the 1928 Olympic Games. He also won four consecutive AAU shot put titles (1928–31), the NCAA title in 1927, and the AAU indoor titles in 1930 and 1932.

Early film career as Tarzan

Brix moved to Los Angeles in 1929 after being invited to compete for the Los Angeles Athletic Club and befriended actor Douglas Fairbanks Jr., who arranged a screen test for him at Paramount.

In 1931, MGM, adapting author Edgar Rice Burroughs's popular Tarzan adventures for the screen, selected Brix to play the title character. Brix, however, broke his shoulder filming the 1931 football film Touchdown, so swimming champion Johnny Weissmuller replaced Brix and became a major star.
After Ashton Dearholt convinced Burroughs to allow him to form Burroughs-Tarzan Enterprises, Inc., and make a Tarzan serial film, Dearholt cast Brix in the lead. Pressbook copy has it that Burroughs made the choice himself, but, in fact, in his biography, Brix confirmed that Burroughs never even saw him until after the contract was signed, and then only briefly. The film was begun on location in Guatemala, under rugged conditions (jungle diseases and cash shortages were frequent). Brix did his own stunts, including a fall to rocky cliffs below. The Washington Post quoted Gabe Essoe's passage from his book Tarzan of the Movies: "Brix's portrayal was the only time between the silents and the 1960s that Tarzan was accurately depicted in films. He was mannered, cultured, soft-spoken, a well educated English lord who spoke several languages, and didn't grunt."

Due to financial mismanagement, Dearholt had to complete filming of much of the serial back in Hollywood, and Brix, although his travel and daily living expenses in Guatemala were covered throughout the shoot, never received his contracted salary, along with the rest of the cast. The finished film, The New Adventures of Tarzan, was released in 1935 by Burroughs-Tarzan, and offered to theatres as a 12-chapter serial or a seven-reel feature. A second feature, Tarzan and the Green Goddess, was culled from the footage in 1938. He also portrayed the titular hero in Republic's serial Hawk of the Wilderness.

Name change and film career
Brix continued to work in serials and action features for low-budget studios until 1939. Finding himself still typecast as Tarzan in the minds of major producers, Brix changed his name to "Bruce Bennett" and became a member of Columbia Pictures' stock company. During the next few years he would be seen playing minor roles in many Columbia films, ranging from expensive dramas to B mysteries and slapstick comedies (How High Is Up? with The Three Stooges, The Spook Speaks with Buster Keaton. etc.). His screen career was interrupted by World War II, when he served in the United States Navy.

Bennett appeared in many films in the 1940s and early 1950s, including Sahara (1943) with Humphrey Bogart, Mildred Pierce (1945) with Joan Crawford, Nora Prentiss (1947) with Ann Sheridan, Dark Passage (1947) with Bogart and Lauren Bacall, The Man I Love (1947) with Ida Lupino, a major role in The Treasure of the Sierra Madre (1948) with Bogart and Walter Huston, Mystery Street (1950) with Ricardo Montalbán, Sudden Fear (1952) with Joan Crawford and Gloria Grahame and Strategic Air Command (1955) with James Stewart.

The Washington Post noted, "Bennett moved into grittier roles in the late 1940s and early 1950s, playing a detective in William Castle's Undertow and a forensic scientist who helps solve a crime in John Sturges' Mystery Street. He also portrayed a key role (an aging baseball player) in Angels in the Outfield (1951).

In 1954, Bennett played William Quantrill, the Confederate guerrilla figure, in an episode of the syndicated television series Stories of the Century, starring and narrated by Jim Davis. Bennett made five guest appearances on Perry Mason, including his role as murder victim Lawrence Balfour in the 1958 episode "The Case of the Lucky Loser" and as murderer Dan Morgan in the 1961 episode "The Case of the Misguided Missile." He was also in five episodes of Science Fiction Theatre.

From the mid-1950s on, Bennett mainly appeared in B-films and on television in guest-starring roles. Two films from this period are The Alligator People (1959) and the Fiend of Dope Island (filmed 1959, released 1961). Bennett, in fact, co-wrote the latter production and portrays the title character.

Personal life

Bennett had two children, Christopher Brix and Christina Katich, by longtime wife Jeannette, who died in 2000. They named their children after his parents. They had three grandchildren and two great-grandchildren.

Outside his acting career, Bennett became a very successful businessman during the 1960s. He also continued to pursue his lifelong interest in parasailing and skydiving. He last skydived at the age of 96, descending from an altitude of 10,000 feet near Lake Tahoe.

Bennett turned 100 on May 19, 2006, and died less than a year later in February 2007 of complications from a broken hip.

Selected filmography

 Touchdown (1931) as Football Player (uncredited)
 Million Dollar Legs (1932) as Klopstokian Athlete (uncredited)
 Movie Crazy (1932) as Dinner Guest (uncredited)
 Madison Square Garden (1932) as Wrestler (uncredited)
 College Humor (1933) as Student (uncredited) (as Herman Brix)
 Meet the Baron (1933) as Train Passenger (uncredited)
 You Can't Buy Everything (1934) as Bank Clerk (uncredited)
 Lazy River (1934) as Sailor (uncredited)
 Riptide (1934) as Man at Cannes Bar (uncredited)
 Treasure Island (1934) as Man at Tavern (uncredited)
 Death on the Diamond (1934) as Man on Ticket Line (uncredited)
 Student Tour (1934) as Hercules – Crewman (uncredited)
 The New Adventures of Tarzan (1935) as Tarzan (as Bruce Bennett)
 Shadow of Chinatown (1936) as Martin Andrews (as Herman Brix)
 Two Minutes to Play (1936) as Martin Granville (as Herman Brix)
 Silk and Saddles (1936) as Jimmy Shay (as Herman Brix)
 Blake of Scotland Yard (1937) as Adolph – Henchman (uncredited)
 A Million to One (1937) as Johnny Kent (as Herman Brix)
 Fighting Fists (1937) as Hal "Chopper' Donovan, aka Hal Smith (as Herman Brix)
 Sky Racket (1937) as Eric Lane – Agent 17 (as Herman Brix)
 Million Dollar Racket (1937) as Lawrence 'Larry' Duane (as Herman Brix)
 Danger Patrol (1937) as Joe (as Herman Brix)
 Amateur Crook (1937) as Jimmy Baxter (as Herman Brix)
 The Lone Ranger (1938, Serial) as Bert Rogers (as Herman Brix)
 Land of Fighting Men (1938) as Fred Mitchell (as Herman Brix)
 Fighting Devil Dogs (1938, Serial) as Lieutenant Frank Corby (as Herman Brix)
 Hawk of the Wilderness (1938, Serial) as Lincoln Rand Jr / Kioga (as Herman Brix)
 Tarzan and the Green Goddess (1938) as Tarzan (archive footage)
 Daredevils of the Red Circle (1939, Short) as Tiny Dawson (as Herman Brix)
 Five Little Peppers and How They Grew (1939) as Tom – King's Chauffeur (uncredited)
 Blondie Brings Up Baby (1939) as Mason's Chauffeur (uncredited)
 My Son Is Guilty (1939) as Lefty (first film credited as Bruce Bennett)
 Invisible Stripes (1939) as Rich Man (uncredited)
 Cafe Hostess (1940) as Budge
 Convicted Woman (1940) as Reporter (uncredited)
 Five Little Peppers at Home (1940) as Jim – King's Chauffeur (uncredited)
 Blazing Six Shooters (1940) as Geologist Winthrop
 The Man with Nine Lives (1940) as State Trooper (uncredited)
 The Man from Tumbleweeds (1940) as Prison Warden (uncredited)
 Escape to Glory (1940) as Ship's gunnery officer
 Island of Doomed Men (1940) as Hazen – Guard (uncredited)
 The Lone Wolf Meets a Lady (1940) as McManus – Motorcycle Cop
 Babies for Sale (1940) as Policeman (uncredited)
 Girls of the Road (1940) as Officer Sullavan
The Secret Seven (1940) as Pat Norris
 Before I Hang (1940) as Dr. Paul Ames
 Hi-Yo Silver (1940) as Bert Rogers (archive footage)
 Glamour for Sale (1940) as Minor Role (uncredited)
 So You Won't Talk (1940) as Reporter (uncredited)
 West of Abilene (1940) as Frank Garfield
 The Lone Wolf Keeps a Date (1940) as Scotty
 Phantom Submarine (1940) as Paul Sinclair
 Two Latins from Manhattan (1941) as Federal Agent
 The Officer and the Lady (1941) as Bob Conlon
 Three Girls About Town (1941) as Reporter (uncredited)
 So Long Mr. Chumps (1941) as Prison Guard (uncredited role in this Three Stooges short)
 Honolulu Lu (1941) as Skelly
 Tramp, Tramp, Tramp (1942) as Tommy Lydel
 Submarine Raider (1942) as 1st Officer Russell
 Atlantic Convoy (1942) as Capt. Morgan
 Sabotage Squad (1942) as Lieutenant John Cronin
 Underground Agent (1942) as Lee Graham
 Murder in Times Square (1943) as Supai George
 The More the Merrier (1943) as FBI Agent Evans
 Frontier Fury (1943) as Clem Hawkins (uncredited)
 Sahara (1943) as Waco Hoyt
 There's Something About a Soldier (1943) as Frank Molloy
 U-Boat Prisoner (1944) as Archie Gibbs
 I'm from Arkansas (1944) as Bob Hamline
 Mildred Pierce (1945) as Bert Pierce
 Danger Signal (1945) as Dr. Andrew Lang
 Shadows of Chinatown (1946) (uncredited)
 A Stolen Life (1946) as Jack R. Talbot
 The Man I Love (1947) as San Thomas
 Nora Prentiss (1947) as Dr. Joel Merriam
 Cheyenne (1947) as Ed Landers
 Dark Passage (1947) as Bob
 The Treasure of the Sierra Madre (1948) as James Cody
 To the Victor (1948) as Henderson
 Silver River (1948) as Stanley Moore
 Smart Girls Don't Talk (1948) as Marty Fain
 The Younger Brothers (1949) as Jim Younger
 Task Force (1949) as McCluskey
 The House Across the Street (1949) as Matthew J. Keever
 The Doctor and the Girl (1949) as Dr. Alfred Norton
 Without Honor (1949) as Fred Bandle
 Undertow (1949) as Det. Charles Reckling
 Mystery Street (1950) as Dr. McAdoo
 Shakedown (1950) as David Glover
 The Second Face (1950) as Paul Curtis
 The Great Missouri Raid (1951) as Cole Younger / Steve Brill
 The Last Outpost (1951) as Col. Jeb Britton
 Angels in the Outfield (1951) as Saul Hellman
 Sudden Fear (1952) as Steve Kearney
 Dream Wife (1953) as Charlie Elkwood
 Dragonfly Squadron (1954) as Dr. Stephen Cottrell
 The Big Tipoff (1955) as Bob Gilmore
 Strategic Air Command (1955) as Gen. Espy
 Robbers' Roost (1955) as 'Bull' Herrick
 Survival in Box Canyon (1955–1957, TV Series) as Dr. Sheldon Thorpe / General Frank Terrance / Major Sorenson / Dr. Hugh Bentley / Gen. Troy
 Hidden Guns (1956) as Stragg
 The Bottom of the Bottle (1956) as Brand
 The Three Outlaws (1956) as Charlie Trenton
 Daniel Boone, Trail Blazer (1956) as Daniel Boone
 Love Me Tender (1956) as Maj. Kincaid
 Three Violent People (1956) as Commissioner Harrison
 Flaming Frontier (1958) as Capt. Jim Hewson
 Perry Mason (1958) as Lawrence Balfour 
 The Cosmic Man (1959) as Dr. Karl Sorenson
 The Alligator People (1959) as Dr. Eric Lorimer
 The Outsider (1961) as Gen. Bridges
 Fiend of Dope Island (1961) as Charlie Davis
 Lost Island of Kioga (1966) as Lincoln Rand Jr., aka Kioga (TV feature version of the 1938 serial "Hawk of the Wilderness", q.v.)
 The Clones (1973) as Clone Lab Assistant
 Deadhead Miles (1973) as Johnny Mesquitero
 Let the Doctor Shove (1980) as John Vandenberk (final film role)

See also
 List of centenarians (actors, filmmakers and entertainers)

References
Notes

Bibliography
Chapman, Mike. Please Don't Call Me Tarzan. Culture House Press
Ephraim Katz: Encyclopedia of Film

External links

Interview with Herman Brix aka Bruce Bennett
Washington Post obituary

1906 births
2007 deaths
20th-century American male actors
American centenarians
American male film actors
American male shot putters
American male television actors
American people of German descent
Athletes (track and field) at the 1928 Summer Olympics
Male actors from Tacoma, Washington
Male film serial actors
Medalists at the 1928 Summer Olympics
Men centenarians
Olympic silver medalists for the United States in track and field
Olympic silver medalists in athletics (track and field)
People associated with physical culture
Players of American football from Tacoma, Washington
Track and field athletes from Washington (state)
University of Washington College of Arts and Sciences alumni
Washington Huskies football players